Mustilia falcipennis is a moth in the family Endromidae first described by Francis Walker in 1865. It is found in India and Bhutan.

The wingspan is about 52 mm. The head and collar are chestnut, while the thorax and abdomen are purplish red brown, the latter yellowish towards the extremity. The forewings are red brown, suffused with grey. The hindwings have a yellow costal half, while the inner half is red brown.

The larvae feed on the leaves of Symplocos species. The body of mature larvae is dark brown, speckled with minute yellow dots within each of which a short bristle is found. There is an extensile sublateral flap of skin on the metathoracic and two anterior abdominal segments. When the larva is disturbed this flap is expanded, with the head and anterior part of the thorax retracted, the inflatable organ expands to resemble an eye, and the caudal horn is swung from side to side. Pupation takes place in a small cocoon of tough brown silk spun amongst leaves of the host plant.

References

Moths described in 1865
Mustilia